Space Art is a French electronic music duo consisting of Dominique Perrier on keyboards and late French drummer Roger "Bunny" Rizzitelli. The band had its main commercial success between 1977 and 1981.

History

Formation
In 1974, Dominique Perrier had been working as an arranger with Christophe, for whom Roger "Bunny" Rizzitelli had been drumming. Christophe brought an ARP Odyssey synthesizer, which was used mainly as a metronome, into the studio. Christophe then lent the synthesizer to Perrier for two years, during which time the band was born.

According to Perrier, he originally preferred to name the band Moon but, after a trip to a funfair, Rizzitelli suggested an alternative; one of the fair attractions had been named after Spessart, the German mountain range. This then morphed into Space Art, which sounded better to them both.

Career
They released three albums between 1977 and 1980, selling three million units worldwide and achieving number one status in France. Their music is often described as cosmic synth pop. The duo are considered pioneers of the French electronic music genre. In 1981, they supported Jean-Michel Jarre during his Concerts in China tour, thereby becoming among the first Western musicians to perform in China during Chinese economic reform; Perrier later played keyboards on various Jarre albums, for the band  and also for Gipsy Kings.

Following the death of Roger Rizzitelli, his son Tommy joined the group as the drummer. A tribute record was released in 2012 by Perrier and his new band, remaking some Space Art tracks.

Discography
Singles:
"Onyx": 1977, IF Records
"Speedway": 1978, Carrère
"Nous savons tout": 1978, Carrère
"Symphonix": 1981, Carrère

Albums:
 Space Art (Onyx): 1977, IF Records #CA631-67173
 Trip In The Center Head: 1979, IF Records #CA631-67213
 Play Back (3): 1980, Waves Records #CA651-67575
 On Ne Dira Rien - Best Of All Times: 2016, Because Music (compilation album)

Re-releases:

 Space Art (Onyx): 1998, Spalax
 Trip In The Center Head: 1997, Spalax
 Space Art (Onyx): 2009, C.Zen Prod

New albums:

 Space Art Tribute - Pype Line: 2012
 Entrevues: 2020, Deserted Island Music

See also
Janet Woollacott, Dominique Perrier's late wife

References

Further reading

External links

Electronic music duos
French electronic music groups
French musical duos
Male musical duos
Masked musicians